Interlaken Resort District is located near Twin Lakes, Colorado and was one of the most scenic and most popular resort areas in the mountains of Colorado, in the United States. Located across from the town of Twin Lakes, it began operations in 1879 as a small and unpretentious hotel called the Lakeside Resort on the smaller of the two lakes at the foot of Mt. Elbert. In the 1950s the Twin Lakes were enlarged and Interlaken was cut off from the town and only accessible by boat. The hotel closed shortly after the lake was enlarged.

The Interlaken Hotel is a two-story log structure, roughly cruciform in plan, with brick chimneys in the center of its two main wings.

See also
National Register of Historic Places listings in Lake County, Colorado

References

External links
 Lake County

Hotel buildings on the National Register of Historic Places in Colorado
History Colorado
Lake County, Colorado
Historic districts on the National Register of Historic Places in Colorado
National Register of Historic Places in Lake County, Colorado